Eury is a surname. Notable people with the surname include:

Jacob Eury (1765–1848), French luthier and bow maker
Michael Eury (born 1957), American comic book editor and writer
Tony Eury Jr. (born 1973), NASCAR crew chief

See also
Eudy